In enzymology, a bis(5'-nucleosyl)-tetraphosphatase (asymmetrical) is an enzyme that catalyzes the chemical reaction

P1,P4-bis(5'-guanosyl) tetraphosphate + H2O  GTP + GMP

Thus, the two substrates of this enzyme are P1,P4-bis(5'-guanosyl) tetraphosphate and H2O, whereas its two products are GTP and GMP.

This enzyme belongs to the family of hydrolases, specifically those acting on acid anhydrides in phosphorus-containing anhydrides.  The systematic name of this enzyme class is P1,P4-bis(5'-nucleosyl)-tetraphosphate nucleotidohydrolase. Other names in common use include bis(5'-guanosyl)-tetraphosphatase, bis(5'-adenosyl)-tetraphosphatase, diguanosinetetraphosphatase (asymmetrical), dinucleosidetetraphosphatase (asymmetrical), diadenosine P1,P4-tetraphosphatase, dinucleoside tetraphosphatase, and 1-P,4-P-bis(5'-nucleosyl)-tetraphosphate nucleotidohydrolase.  This enzyme participates in purine metabolism and pyrimidine metabolism.

Structural studies

References

 
 
 

EC 3.6.1
Enzymes of known structure